Albee may refer to:

Places
 Albee, California, U.S., also known as Albeeville
 Albee, South Dakota, U.S.
 Albee Township, Michigan, U.S.

Other uses
 Albee (surname)
Albee Benitez (Alfredo Abelardo Bantug Benitez, born 1966), a Filipino businessman and politician
 10051 Albee, an asteroid

See also